The Grave Stele of Dexileos, is the stele of the tomb of an Athenian cavalryman named Dexileos (Greek: Δεξίλεως) who died in the Corinthian War against Sparta in 394 BC. The stele is attributed to “The Dexileos Sculptor”. Its creation can be dated to 394 BC, based on the inscription on its bottom, which provides the dates of birth and death of Dexileos. It includes a high relief sculpture depicting a battle scene with an inscription below it. The stele was discovered in 1863 AD in the family plot of Dexileos at the Dipylon cemetery in Kerameikos, Athens. It was found in situ, but was moved during World War II and is now on display in the Kerameikos Museum in Athens.

Description
The stele is carved in high relief and depicts a cavalryman, Dexileos, mounted on a horse, charging a Spartan enemy, probably at the 394 BC Battle of Nemea during the Corinthian War. Dexileos is seen in his youthfulness, shown through the lack of a beard being present. He wears a chiton, chlamys, and petasos as well as krepides on his feet. His garments flow in the wind as his horse rears upwards. Dexileos raises one arm to hold a spear, which has since been lost from the sculpture as it was an attachment of a different material. His torso twists forward in the frontal position while his head is in ¾ position, slanted with his gaze down towards his foe. The spear, reins, and petasos, which is a wide brimmed hat usually worn by Athenian ephebe, are all missing from the stele. Remnants of their presence are marked by stains and dowel holes in the relief where they would have been attached. Below the horse is Dexileos’s enemy, who has fallen in battle and is shielding himself from the equine with one arm covering his head. The greek enemy is seen in the frontal position with his head up towards Dexileos. The enemy is also depicted completely nude, representing his vulnerability as well as his worthiness as an opponent. The inscription below the relief says:

This not only gives an exact date of Dexileos’s lifespan but also describes his death in battle at Corinth. The entire stele relief scene is bordered on top with a pediment adorned with acroteria, which gives it a religious aspect with reference to naiskos, a small temple in the classical order.

Context
The Dexileos stele reflects Athens during a time of chaos and disorder. Following the Athenian loss of the Peloponnesian War, Athenian democracy was finally restored after the ruling of Thirty Tyrants. Athens was also facing a war with Sparta at this time, the Corinthian War. Dexileos was a young cavalryman who died at the age of 20, which can be seen through the inscription that reveals his lifespan. Dexileos would have been an ephebe, going through his rite of passage to become a full, democratic citizen, like other Athenian men. This process included serving in the military for three years. This stele shares characteristics of two distinct ideologies in the classical period relating to death in battle; One being a very individualistic depiction glorifying the deceased and the other being an inclusion of aristocracy within Athenian democracy and depicting death as a sacrifice for the state. While this monument depicts wealthy Dexileos in triumph, bringing pride to his family, it also shows how he is part of the Athenian community, making a sacrifice of life for his people.

Location

The Dexileos Stele is one of three monuments honoring an Athenian warrior in the Dipylon cemetery. One other monument, the Polyandron, honors all those soldiers who died for the city within a certain year, including the death of Dexileos. All these soldiers remains, including those of the elite cavalry status as well as less wealthy foot soldiers, were mixed together, burned, and placed in the Demosion Sema for burial. This ritual equated all Athenians after death to create a complete, whole democracy. The other monument honored all fallen cavalrymen, listing eleven including Dexileos in total. This monument preserved the sacrifices of those cavalrymen to democracy.

Funerary crown

Another monument was discovered, dedicated to five Athenian cavalrymen including Dexileos. Only the crown of the public funerary monument remains, now in Athens National Archaeological Museum. The monument, in pentelic marble, was found west of Athens, in the area of the Demosion Sema. According to the inscription on the epistyle, the monument was erected in honour of the Athenian riders who fell in the Battle of Corinth (394) and the Battle of Coronea (394 BC). The list of the fallen includes the name of Dexileos, the young man who was also commemorated by means of a private relief stele that came to light in the ancient cemetery of the Kerameikos.

See also
 Kerameikos steles
 Dimitris Mytaras' Dexileos in Dafni metro station
 Thracian horseman

References

External links

Kerameikos
4th-century BC steles
394 BC
1863 archaeological discoveries
Archaeological discoveries in Greece
Horses in art
Funerary steles
Burial monuments and structures in Greece
Nemea